The CT Institute of Technology, is accredited by All India Council for Technical Education and affiliated to Punjab Technical University, is located at Shahpur (near Lambra) about  from Jalandhar Bus Stand and  from Jalandhar Railway Station.

The institute was established in 2008. It offers seats in disciplines; computer science engineering (CSE), electrical and electronics engineering (EEE), electronics and communication engineering (ECE) and information technology (IT) with the intake of 60 seats in each discipline. A new discipline, civil engineering, was added in 2009. The intake of students  increased from 60 to 120 for ECE and CE in the year 2010.

Departments
 Mechanical engineering
 Electrical and electronics engineering
 Civil engineering
 Computer science engineering
 Electronics and communication engineering 
 Information technology
 Automobile Engineering

References

External links
Ctgroup.in
Ctgroup.in

Jalandhar district